Edward "Ed" Victor  (9 September 1939 – 7 June 2017) was an American literary agent, based, for most of his career, in London, England.

Biography
Victor was born on 9 September 1939, in Bronx, New York City. The son of Russian-Jewish immigrant parents, who ran a photographic equipment store, he went to Bayside High School in the borough of Queens, later earning a bachelor's degree from Dartmouth College. After graduating, he attended Pembroke College, University of Cambridge, on a Marshall Scholarship in 1961.

Publishing editor
Victor married Michelene Samuels, the writer, in 1963; the couple made their home in London and had two children. Victor worked for the Oborne Press, a publishing house, then part of Lord Beaverbrook's Express Newspapers group. He then worked on coffee table books for Weidenfeld & Nicolson. After approaching George Weidenfeld in the toilet, Victor was moved to general publishing, looking after the works of Saul Bellow and Vladimir Nabokov.

Ink
In 1970, his first marriage ended in divorce. In 1971, Victor co-founded the countercultural newspaper Ink with Oz founders Felix Dennis and Richard Neville. By 1972, conflict about what Ink should be led to its failure, and Victor returned to the United States to work for Knopf.

Literary agent
Victor married his second wife, American lawyer Carol Ryan, and, after a year travelling, made their main home in London to be close to Victor's children. Victor was one of the first former journalist/editors to make the move to be a publishing agent, when in the 1970s literary agents were not welcomed by British publishers. However, many changed their minds when Victor's first sale in 1976 was for the book and film rights to Stephen Shephard's novel The Four Hundred for $1.5 million. In 2005, Victor's client John Banville won the Booker Prize. The following day Victor sold Eric Clapton's memoirs for $4 million.

Rather than take "blind" scripts sent to him, Victor instead began to gain clients through personal reference. He is recalled as being "the first agent to increase his commission from 10% to 15%. Few of his clients complained and over the years other agents quietly followed him....He negotiated deals for his authors that few could match." In 2003, Victor and his wife were named second on Tatler's list of the most invited guests in London, behind Elton John.

In the 2016 New Year Honours he was appointed Commander of the Order of the British Empire (CBE) for his services to literature. In September 2016, it was reported that David Cameron had signed with Victor to write his memoirs.

He celebrated the 40th anniversary of his literary agency, Ed Victor Ltd, in November 2016.

Personal life
With his second wife, Carol Ryan, Victor lived mainly in London, with a secondary home in the Hamptons on Long Island, in the United States. The couple had a son, Ryan, while Victor had sons, Adam and Ivan, from his first marriage to Michelene Wandor. In 2002, Victor suffered an attack of viral pneumonia, but fully recovered.

The same year, Victor published his first book, The Obvious Diet – Your Personal Way to Lose Weight Fast Without Changing Your Lifestyle, through Ebury Press and Arcade Publishing.

Victor was vice chairman of the board of directors of the Almeida Theatre, a Trustee of the Arts Foundation and of the Hay Festival, as well as a founding director of the Groucho Club.

Death
On 7 June 2017, while suffering from chronic lymphocytic leukemia, Victor died from a heart attack.

Selected clients
From official website

Douglas Adams (Estate)
John Banville
Johanna Basford
Candice Bergen
Carl Bernstein
Max Brooks 
Mel Brooks
Tina Brown
Alastair Campbell
Raymond Chandler (Estate)
Eric Clapton
Sophie Dahl
Joe Eszterhas
Sir Harold Evans
Rupert Everett
Sir Ranulph Fiennes
Frederick Forsyth
James Fox
Mark Frost
A. A. Gill
Charles Glass
Julian Glover
Annabel Goldsmith
Geordie Greig
Josephine Hart (Estate)
Jack Higgins
Will Hutton
Dylan Jones
Nigella Lawson
Kathy Lette
Natascha McElhone
Andrew Marr
Iris Murdoch (Estate)
Richard Neville
Edna O'Brien
Ben Okri
Roman Polanski
Frederic Raphael
Keith Richards
Ruth Rogers
Lisa St Aubin de Terán
Gerald Scarfe
Sir Stephen Spender (Estate)
Pamela Stephenson
Peter Stothard
Pete Townshend
Irving Wallace (Estate)
Tim Waterstone
Lord Lloyd Webber
U2

References

External links
 Official website
 Ed Victor Ltd at Writers' & Artists' Yearbook

1939 births
2017 deaths
Alumni of Pembroke College, Cambridge
American book editors
American emigrants to England
American expatriates in England
American male journalists
American people of Russian-Jewish descent
Bayside High School (Queens) alumni
British Jews
British people of Russian-Jewish descent
Commanders of the Order of the British Empire
Dartmouth College alumni
Journalists from New York City
Literary agents
Marshall Scholars
Naturalised citizens of the United Kingdom
People from the Bronx